Center for Theoretical Physics may refer to:

 Asia Pacific Center for Theoretical Physics, Pohang University of Science and Technology, Pohang, South Korea
 Berkeley Center for Theoretical Physics, University of California at Berkeley, U.S.
 Center for Mathematics and Theoretical Physics, Rome, Italy
 Indian Institute of Technology Kharagpur, West Bengal, India
 International Centre for Theoretical Physics, Trieste, Italy
Maryland Center for Fundamental Physics, College Park, Maryland, U.S. 
 MIT Center for Theoretical Physics, Cambridge, Massachusetts, U.S.
 National Center for Theoretical Sciences, Physics, Hsinchu, Taiwan
 Simons Center for Geometry and Physics, Stony Brook University, New York

See also
 Institute for Theoretical Physics (disambiguation)